Linghu is a Chinese compound surname. During the Zhou Dynasty, a general, Wei Ke (魏顆) scored many victories for Zhou and was granted the city of Linghu. All his descendants took the compound surname Linghu.

Notable people
Bruce Linghu, Taiwanese politician and diplomat
Linghu Chu, an official of Tang Dynasty
Linghu Defen, a historian-official of Tang Dynasty
Linghu Tao, an official of Tang Dynasty
Ling Jihua (Chinese: 令计划; born 1956, originally Linghu Jihua) former Chinese politician as one of the principal political advisers of former leader Hu Jintao

Fictional: Linghu Chong, the protagonist in Louis Cha's wuxia novel The Smiling, Proud Wanderer

Chinese-language surnames
Individual Chinese surnames